Mastodonsaurus (meaning "teat tooth lizard") is an extinct genus of temnospondyl amphibian from the Middle Triassic of Europe. It belongs to a Triassic group of temnospondyls called Capitosauria, characterized by their large body size and presumably aquatic lifestyles. Mastodonsaurus remains one of the largest amphibians known, and may have exceeded 6 meters (20 feet) in length.

Description

Narrow grooves on the surface of the skull bones called sulci show it had sensory organs that could detect vibrations and pressure under water, similar to the lateral lines on fish. The large, oval eye sockets are midway along the skull with the nostrils near the tip of the snout. Small ear holes (otic notches) are indented on either side of the back of the skull. The upper surface of the skull bones of Mastodonsaurus bore an intricate pattern of pits and ridges, a feature found in many temnospondyls. The function of this rugged ornamentation is not fully understood. As with other capitosaurs, Mastodonsaurus had a pineal foramen (opening) between the parietal bones behind the orbits on the roof of the skull, which would have contained a light-sensing parietal eye linked to the pineal gland to regulate the circadian sleep-wake cycle and hormone production related to body temperature for a cold-blooded (ectotherm) animal and to reproduction. 

The sides of upper jaw are lined with a double row of small conical teeth, while the lower jaw has a single row of similar small teeth. The upper and lower arrangement of small, narrow teeth could function like a trap for small prey when Mastodonsaurus closed its mouth. The tip of the upper jaw has a set of larger teeth. Behind these teeth at the front end of the palate on the underside of the skull are sets of small teeth and multiple pairs of large fangs or tusks (about 8 in all). Two large tusks project up from the end of the lower jaw, fitting through openings on the palate and emerging out from the top of the skull in front of the nostrils when the jaw is closed. 

The exact number of vertebrae in the skeleton is still not known but recent research shows that  Mastodonsaurus  had about 28 trunk vertebrae and a relatively long tail, revised from the squat body shape and short tail assumed in earlier reconstructions. Isolated teeth up to 14 cm (6 in) long indicate that old individuals grew even larger.

Paleobiology

The marked reduction of the limbs, the strong tail and sensory grooves on the head called sulci show that Mastodonsaurus was an aquatic animal that rarely, if ever, ventured on land. Mastodonsaurus may have been completely unable to leave the water, as large quantities of bones have been found that suggest individuals died en masse when pools dried up during times of drought. It normally inhabited freshwater to brackish swamps, lakes, and river deltas. Fossil skull remains found in marine sediments suggest it also may have entered into saltier environments on occasion.

Its tail was likely thickened with a fleshy fin for propulsion. The stronger tail in combination with small limbs, a trunk section stiffened with long, broadened, overlapping ribs, and extra-heavy bones would indicate that Mastodonsaurus was an aquatic ambush predator that lurked on the bottom in wait for prey, making sudden, rapid attacks with its giant mouth and impaling tusks, propelled by its tail.

Mastodonsaurus lived mainly on fish, whose remains have been found in its fossilized coprolites. The fossils of some smaller temnospondyls bear tooth marks made by Mastodonsaurus-like animals and there is evidence for cannibalism by adults on juveniles of Mastodonsaurus. It probably also ate land-living animals, such as small archosaurs that ventured into or along the edge of water. Bite marks on Mastodonsaurus bones show that the large terrestrial archosaur Batrachotomus actively preyed on the giant amphibians, entering the water or attacking individuals stranded in pools during droughts.

Mastodonsaurus was once thought to be responsible for the footprints found in Triassic sandstones and described as Chirotherium, but later research found that the tracks belong to crocodile-like pseudosuchian reptiles. Based on the misattributed tracks and misidentified bones from other Triassic animals, early illustrations depicted the giant amphibians (often referred to as "Labyrinthodon" at the time) as big froglike creatures that supposedly crossed their legs as they walked since the outer fifth digit on the Chirotherium footprints resembled a thumb.

Most of the skeleton of Mastodonsaurus, apart from skulls and jaws, remained poorly known until recently. Both scientific and popular sources continued to describe Mastodonsaurus as having a squat, frog-like body and a short tail from the 19th century into the 20th century, including for the "Labyrinthodon" sculptures by Waterhouse Hawkins at the Crystal Palace outside London in 1854 and in a painting  of Mastodonsaurus  by the famous Czech paleoartist Zdeněk Burian in 1955.  A life-size model put on display for the American Museum of Natural History Hall of Vertebrate Origins in 1996 also restored Mastodonsaurus with a short, broad body and a short tail, and so presumably able to crawl on land. 

A site discovered during road construction near the town of Kupferzell in southern Germany in 1977 provided researchers with important new fossils of Mastodonsaurus that included well preserved skulls and disarticulated bones from all parts of the body. Thousands of individual fossils were recovered during a three-month salvage operation before road work resumed, including, in addition to Mastodonsaurus, remains of the temnospondyl Gerrothorax and the archosaur Batrachotomus, as well as of many fishes. Some of the bones showed evidence of being rolled and transported a long distance. Working from the rich Kupferzell finds, German paleontologist Rainer Schoch published a revised description of Mastodonsaurus in 1999 that revealed a longer body and an estimated longer tail, for a larger, more massive animal with a highly aquatic lifestyle. Although no complete and fully articulated skeleton has been found to date, research since 1999 was incorporated into a composite skeletal reconstruction and a fleshed-out model displayed at the Staatliches Museum für Naturkunde Stuttgart in Germany that give Mastodonsaurus more crocodile-like proportions, with a lengthened tail for swimming, similar to some other capitosaurs.

The growth stages of Mastodonsaurus are documented from numerous specimens found at Kupferzell, with skulls that range from 30 cm (12 in) up through 125 cm (50 in) long. Stereospondyls lacked a true larval stage of development and Mastodonsaurus followed a slow, conservative ontogenetic pattern with relatively minor changes as it grew so that small juveniles would have resembled adults.

History and etymology

The German paleontologist Georg Friedrich von Jaeger gave the name Mastodonsaurus in 1828 to a single large conical fang with vertical striations and a worn off tip, found in the Triassic Lettenkeuper deposits near Gaildorf in Baden-Württemberg in southern Germany. Jaeger assumed the big tooth (a snout fang about 10.4 cm (4.1 in) long as preserved) belonged to a giant reptile and that the indented missing tip was a distinctive natural feature that, when viewed from above, resembled a nipple or teat with a small hole in the middle, which he expressed in the name Mastodonsaurus or "teat tooth lizard" (from Greek mastos "breast, nipple" + odous (odon) "tooth" +  sauros "lizard"): "Dieser Zahn ist nämlich besonders ausgezeichnet durch seine zitzenartige Spitze." [This tooth namely is especially distinguished by its teat-like tip.] He illustrated the tooth and its "teat-like" tip in a plate (Plate IV, figure 4). However, Jaeger did not provide a type species name for Mastodonsaurus. 

Also in 1828, Jaeger identified part of the back of a large skull found in the same area as coming from an amphibian-like animal because of the double articulation of the occipital condyles. He gave the creature the genus-species name combination Salamandroides giganteus, meaning "gigantic salamander-like (animal)".  The fossil was later identified as a specimen of Mastodonsaurus.

The name Mastodonsaurus has led to confusion over its intended meaning, and as pointed out by the British paleontologist Richard Owen, the name could be misinterpreted as a reference to the extinct mastodon elephant, supposedly to suggest gigantic size ("mastodon(-size) lizard"), the false meaning given in some sources.

Owen noted that the teat-like appearance was not a real diagnostic feature and also objected to the term "saurus" for a "batrachian" (amphibian). He proposed what he thought was the more fitting replacement name Labyrinthodon or "labyrinth tooth" to refer to the complex maze-like appearance of the inner tooth structure when viewed in cross section. However, the rules of zoological nomenclature require that the earliest name established be used and Labyrinthodon Owen is a junior synonym of Mastodonsaurus Jaeger. The maze-like inner tooth structure in Mastodonsaurus is found in multiple types of extinct amphibians, and Richard Owen created the formal taxonomic category Labyrinthodontia (published in 1860) as a supposed order of "Reptilia" to unite them. However, the "order" turned out to contain multiple types of animals that not are not closely related and the category Labyrinthodontia no longer has recognized scientific status, although the general form "labyrinthodont" is still used as a descriptive term.

Species

After a complex nomenclatural history and recognition that the original Mastodonsaurus tooth and the Salamandroides giganteus skull section were from different individuals of the same kind of animal, most authors used the binomial combination Mastodonsaurus giganteus. A reexamination of the genus by Markus Moser and Rainer Schoch in 2007 restored M. jaegeri Holl from 1829 as the historically oldest type species for Mastodonsaurus, designating Jaeger's original tooth (SMNS 55911) as the lectotype of Mastodonsaurus jaegeri. A large number of species have been attributed to the genus over the years, but they determined only three of the species are valid: the type species M. jaegeri, the best known species, M. giganteus (which could be a senior synonym of M. jaegeri if the two species are not taxonomically distinct), both from Europe, and M. torvus from Russia. The species M. acuminatus was shown to be a junior synonym to M. giganteus, while the species M. tantus & M. maximus were both determined to be synonyms of M. torvus. 

The species M. andriani, M. indicus, M. laniarius, M. lavisi, M. meyeri, M. pachygnathus and M. silesiacus, when reexamined by Moser and Schoch, were not deemed assignable to the genus Mastodonsaurus due to the fragmentary nature of the type specimens and as such are considered nomen dubium. Examination of the literature showed M. conicus to be a senior synonym of the genus M. ventricosus; however this species was never formally published and is thus considered a nomen nudum. 

In 1923, German paleontologist Emil Wepfer described the new species Mastodonsaurus cappelensis for fossils found near the town of Kappel in Baden-Württemberg in an older formation than remains of Mastodonsaurus giganteus. Swedish paleontologist Gunnar Säve-Söderbergh erected the new genus Heptasaurus ("seven lizard" for seven skull openings)  for the species in 1935. In his review of Mastodonsaurus, Rainer Schoch (1999) recognized Heptasaurus as a genus that was distinct from Mastodonsaurus, with "smaller orbits and a markedly broader snout tip", and that was found in the Middle and Upper Buntsandstein Formation, earlier than fossils of Mastodonsaurus giganteus.  

This analysis was questioned by Damiani (2001), who used the original name Mastodonsaurus cappelensis for the species. Moser and Schoch (2007) continued to accept the valid status of the genus Heptasaurus but noted that the species "could also be re-referred to Mastodonsaurus". Rayfield, Barrett & Milner (2009) pointed out that the skull and size differences between Heptasaurus and Mastodonsaurus may not be important diagnostic features at a generic level.

In more recent research, Schoch has restored the combination Mastodonsaurus cappelensis for the geologically older species, noting in 2008 that "present evidence indicates close ties with Mastodonsaurus giganteus, which is why this species is here referred to Mastodonsaurus".

The species Mastodonsaurus torvus was described in 1955 by Russian paleontologist Elena Dometevna Konzhukova (wife of paleontologist Ivan Yefremov) based on a lower jaw fragment (holotype PIN 415/1) and other bones unearthed near the village of Koltaevo in Bashkortostan in the Southern Urals in Middle Triassic beds that are part of the Bukobay Svita in Russia. Additional fossils of very large mastodonsaurids have been discovered as well at Middle Triassic sites in the Orenburg Oblast in Russia and in northern Kazakhstan. In 1972, Russian paleontologist Leonid Petrovich Tatarinov found a complete skull (measuring 1.25 meters long) on an expedition to Koltaevo. The giant skull is on display at the Orlov Paleontological Museum (specimen PIN 2867/67) in Moscow in Russia and has been labeled Mastodonsaurus torvus, although some sources cite the specimen as Mastodonsaurus sp. instead. A full scientific description has not been published yet, but differences from Mastodonsaurus giganteus include smaller orbits positioned further back on the skull. 

Researchers debate the generic classification of the Russian fossils, sometimes referring to them as "Mastodonsaurus" in quotes or with a question mark (?) to indicate that further study may justify a separate giant mastodonsaurid genus.

Formerly assigned species
 Mastodonsaurus cappelensis = valid (or Heptasaurus)
 Mastodonsaurus vaslenensis =  possible "heptasaurid". 
 Mastodonsaurus granulosus = Plagiosternum
 Mastodonsaurus arenaceus = Capitosaurus
 Mastodonsaurus robustus = Cyclotosaurus 
 Mastodonsaurus durus = Eupelor (metoposaurid) 
 Mastodonsaurus keuperinus = mix of Metoposaurus and indeterminate mastodonsaurid material. 
 Mastodonsaurus weigelti = junior synonym of Parotosuchus. 
 Labyrinthodon leptognathus = Stereospondyli indeterminate

References

Capitosaurs
Triassic temnospondyls of Europe
Middle Triassic amphibians of Europe
Fossil taxa described in 1828